Emanuele Zamarion (born 4 August 2000) is an Italian professional footballer who plays as a goalkeeper.

Career
On 15 July 2021, Zamarion joined to Serie C club Campobasso.

On 1 September 2022, Zamarion signed with Fidelis Andria. His contract with Fidelis Andria was terminated by mutual consent on 31 January 2023.

Career statistics

References

External links 
 
 
 

2000 births
Living people
Footballers from Rome
Italian footballers
Association football goalkeepers
Serie C players
A.S. Roma players
A.S. Gubbio 1910 players
S.S.D. Città di Campobasso players
S.S. Fidelis Andria 1928 players